Borna Ćorić defeated Stefanos Tsitsipas in the final, 7–6(7–0), 6–2 to win the men's singles tennis title at the 2022 Cincinnati Masters. It was his first Masters 1000 title, and his first title overall since 2018, in Halle. Ranked No. 152 in the world and using a protected ranking for entry, Ćorić became the lowest ranked player to win a Masters 1000 event since its inception in 1990. He defeated five seeded players en route to the title.

Alexander Zverev was the reigning champion, but did not participate due to a long-term ankle injury.

Rafael Nadal and Daniil Medvedev were in contention for the ATP No. 1 ranking. Medvedev retained the top ranking after Nadal lost in the second round to Ćorić.

Seeds
The top eight seeds receive a bye into the second round.

Draw

Finals

Top half

Section 1

Section 2

Bottom half

Section 3

Section 4

Seeded players
The following are the seeded players. Seedings are based on ATP rankings as of August 8, 2022. Rank and points before are as of August 15, 2022.

Points for the 2021 tournament were not mandatory and are included in the table below only if they counted towards the player's ranking as of August 15, 2022. Players who are not defending points from the 2021 tournament will instead have their 19th best result replaced by their points from the 2022 tournament.

† This column shows either the player's points from the 2021 tournament or his 19th best result (shown in brackets). Only ranking points counting towards the player's ranking as of August 15, 2022, are reflected in the column.

Withdrawn players 
The following players would have been seeded, but withdrew before the tournament began.

Other entry information

Wild cards

Protected ranking

Withdrawals

Qualifying

Seeds

Qualifiers

Lucky loser

Qualifying draw

First qualifier

Second qualifier

Third qualifier

Fourth qualifier

Fifth qualifier

Sixth qualifier

Seventh qualifier

References

External links
 Entry List
 Qualifying draw
 Main draw

Men's Singles
Western and Southern Open - Men's Singles